The Historic Center (US) or Centre (UK) of Salvador de Bahia in Brazil, also known as the Pelourinho (Portuguese for "Pillory") or Pelo, is a historic neighborhood in western Salvador, Bahia. It was the city's center during the Portuguese colonial period and was named for the whipping post in its central plaza where enslaved people from Africa were publicly beaten as punishment for alleged infractions. The Historic Center is extremely rich in historical monuments dating from the 17th through the 19th centuries.

Designated a UNESCO World Heritage Site, the Pelourinho retains a vibrant repertoire of colonial Portuguese architecture, exemplified by the Mannerist decoration of the Cathedral of Salvador, the Baroque intricacy of the Church and Convent of São Francisco and the Church of the Third Order of Our Lady of the Rosary of the Black People, as well as the Rococo exuberance of the Church of Nosso Senhor do Bonfim. In addition, the Pelourinho remains a cultural hub for the Afro-Brazilian community, whose cuisine, architecture, religion and music exert a salient influence on the neighborhood and testify to the "empowerment and influence of Afro cultures" in the New World. Although historical preservation efforts initiated in the 1990s enhanced safety, promoted tourism and facilitated greater economic development, they also resulted in the dislocation of Afro-Brazilian residents in the enclave and contributed to gentrification. As such, the development of the Pelourinho continues to attract attention in the gubernatorial politics of Bahia.

Salvador was the first colonial capital of Brazil and the city is one of the oldest in the New World (founded in 1549 by Portuguese settlers). It was also one of the first slave markets on the continent, with slaves arriving to work on the sugar plantations. The area is in the older part of the upper city of Salvador. It encompasses several blocks around the triangular Largo, and it is the location for music, dining and nightlife. It has a place on the national historic register and was named a world cultural center by UNESCO in 1985.

History
Salvador's Historic Center comprises the colonial city's primitive nucleus and its geographical expansion until the end of the 18th century. From Praça Municipal, open within the dense tropical forest by the first general-governor, Tomé de Sousa, in 1549, to largo de Santo Antônio Além do Carmo, battle field where Portuguese and Dutch soldiers from Companhia das Índias Ocidentais fought in 1638, monuments of civil, religious and military architecture make up a scenery that reveals Salvador's inhabitants art and way of living through the centuries. From Portas de Santa Luzia, which kept the southern boundary of the old city safe, with mud walls, to the thick walls of Fort Santo Antônio Além do Carmo, which guarded the north entrance, Salvador's Historic Center is divided in three areas that can be visited all at once: from Praça Municipal to Largo de São Francisco, Pelourinho, and from Largo do Carmo to Largo de Santo Antônio Além do Carmo.

The area between Praça Municipal and Largo de São Francisco chronologically starts from the place chosen by general-governor Tomé de Souza for the construction of the Colonial Government buildings, and in the places occupied by religious brotherhoods that came from Europe in 1549. Praça Municipal was opened because it offered better protection against attacks by natives and corsairs. The Governor's House, the City Hall, the Chapel of Our Lady of Help, and other structures were initially made of mud wall and covered with straw, but later re-built with stone, bricks, and lime. Nowadays, the visitors' preferred historic buildings are the Paço Municipal (completed in the end of the 17th century), the Rio Branco Palace (Palácio Rio Branco, built on the site of the former Governor's House in 1919), and the Lacerda Elevator(), amplified in the thirties. Towards the north are Church and Santa Casa da Misericórdia. The Customs Building at Cayrú Square was constructed in 1861. The Modelo Market near the foot of the elevator in the Comércio district claims to be the largest handicraft market in Latin America.

The Church of the Holy See (Igreja da Sé), an integral part of the architectural set of the Historic Center, was demolished in 1933 along with four other blocks of buildings from the colonial and imperial periods. The Archbishop's Palace, connected to the church, remains. Debates over the destruction of historic sites in Salvador and elsewhere in Brazil led to the first attempts at federal-level protection of historic assets and eventually to the establishment of the National Institute of Historic and Artistic Heritage.

The Terreiro de Jesus, just north of Praça Municipal, is home to structures from the 17th to 19th century constructions. Catedral Basilica, former Igreja dos Jesuítas (Jesuit Church), and churches Ordem Terceira de São Domingos and Church of Saint Peter of the Clergymen (São Pedro dos Clérigos) stand out in Terreiro de Jesus, with its beautiful water fountain in the center.

The former Medical School Building, originally occupied by the Jesuit School, is now the Memorial da Medicina (Medicine Memorial), Arqueologia e Etnologia (Archeology and Ethnology), and Afro-Brasileiro (Afro-Brazilian) museums. The House of the Seven Lamps (Casa dos Sete Candeeiros), now a museum, is nearby. Largo do Cruzeiro de São Francisco (Cruzeiro de São Francisco Largo), practically an extension of Terreiro de Jesus, has an old cross in the center, and, on the back, the monumental religious set made up of São Franscisco Church and Convent, and Church of the Third Order of Saint Francis (Ordem Terceira de São Franscisco Church). The Church of the Third Order of Our Lady of the Rosary of the Black People (Igreja da Ordem Terceira de Nossa Senhora do Rosário dos Pretos), Church of the Blessed Sacrament at Rua do Passo, and Church of the Third Order of Mount Carmel are located further north in the district. Numerous colonial-period historic residences, including the Palace of Saldanha and House of the Seven Deaths, are located on streets outside of the main plazas.

Many buildings of the Historic Center have been renovated since the initial survey of Salvador by the National Institute of Historic and Artistic Heritage in the 1930s. This work extended to the revitalization of whole blocks of historic houses, convents, and churches from the beginning of the 1990s. There are more than 800 buildings with restored façades and interiors; many were adapted to function as small museums and cultural centers.

Protected status

The Historic Center of Salvador as a whole was listed as a national heritage site by the National Institute of Historic and Artistic Heritage in 1984. It was named a UNESCO World Heritage Site by UNESCO in 1985.

References

External links
 Pelourinho digital media archive (Creative Commons-licensed photos, laser scans, panoramas) from a CyArk/UNESCO research partnership.
  Discovering Salvador and Bahia in multiple languages.
 Historic Centre of Salvador de Bahia UNESCO property on Google Arts and Culture

Historic districts
Historic Center (Salvador, Bahia)
National heritage sites of Bahia
Neighbourhoods in Salvador, Bahia
Tourist attractions in Bahia
World Heritage Sites in Brazil